Târgșoru may refer to one of two places in Prahova County, Romania:

Târgșoru Vechi
Târgșoru Nou, a village in Ariceștii Rahtivani Commune